Panyu railway station is a railway station currently under construction in Panyu District, Guangzhou, Guangdong, China. It is scheduled to open in 2021 with the Southern section of Guangzhou–Foshan circular intercity railway (Foshan West – Panyu section). It is situated underneath the existing Guangzhou South railway station, allowing for transfer between the two.

History
This station was originally planned to share the name "Guangzhou South" with the existing railway station. However, in August 2020, the currently under construction station was renamed Panyu.

Interchanges
Panyu railway station is an underground station located beneath Guangzhou South railway station, which is a stop on several high-speed lines and is also served by Line 2, Line 7, Line 22 of Guangzhou Metro and Foshan Metro Line 2.

References 

Railway stations in Guangdong